Harriet McPherson was an American politician, dairy farmer, and educator.

McPherson lived in Stillwater, Minnesota, with her husband and family, and was a dairy farmer. She graduated from Winona State University with a bachelor's degree in elementary education. She served on the Stillwater School Board and was a Republican. McPherson served in the Minnesota House of Representatives from 1985 to 1992.

References

Year of birth unknown
Living people
People from Stillwater, Minnesota
Winona State University alumni
Educators from Minnesota
Farmers from Minnesota
Women state legislators in Minnesota
School board members in Minnesota
Republican Party members of the Minnesota House of Representatives
Year of birth missing (living people)